Robert Willard Hodgson (1893–1966) was an American botanist, taxonomist and agricultural researcher located in the California State, an exceptional citrus and avocado expert. He was a co-author of The Citrus Industry book, emeritus professor of University of California, and dean of the College of Agriculture.

References

External links
 Socialarchive.iath.virginia.edu: Robert Willard Hodgson (1893-1966)
 

American agronomists
Citrus farmers
Pomologists
1893 births
1966 deaths
American botanical writers
American taxonomists
Botanists active in California
University of California faculty
People from Dallas
Scientists from California
20th-century American botanists
20th-century agronomists